Theridion is a genus of tangle-web spiders with a worldwide distribution. Notable species are the Hawaiian happy face spider (T. grallator), named for the iconic symbol on its abdomen, and T. nigroannulatum, one of few spider species that lives in social groups, attacking prey en masse to overwhelm them as a team.

Identification 
Spiders in this genus are about as long or longer then they are wide. Their chelicerae have two or less teeth on the front edge and none on the back edge. The front leg is the longest in both genders, but the next longest is the second leg in males and the fourth leg in females. The epigyne can vary, but the pedipalp has a median apophysis and a colulus is absent from both genders. In several species, the males have mastidia (projections) on the chelicerae.

Theridion has the anterior eye row slightly curved and with a gap between it and the posterior eye row. This distinguishes it from Enoplognatha, another theridiid genus in which the anterior eye row is almost straight and the gap between eye rows is very small.

Ecology 
Theridion build tangle webs, usually under leaves and among vegetation. At night, spiders hang upside-down in these webs. During the day, they hide close by their webs.

Philodromus cespitum, a species of running crab spider, preys on Theridion spiders in European fruit orchards.

Mating 
Mating behaviour has been studied in several Theridion species. It involves pseudocopulation, numerous sperm inductions and copulatory sequences. The male approaches the female to mate, usually in the latter's retreat (a hood-shaped part of the web where the female lives in). Male Theridion perform contralateral insertions, inserting their left palp into the female's right introductory duct and vice versa for the right palp. Female Theridion are less aggressive after mating compared to other genera of theridiids.

Species
There are almost 600 described species of Theridion. However, the genus has traditionally been assigned species that lack a colulus and did not fit into other genera (wastebasket taxon). New species continue to be described on a regular basis.
 T. abruptum Simon, 1884 — North Africa
 T. accoense Levy, 1985 — Israel
 T. acutitarse Simon, 1900 — Hawaii
 T. adjacens (O. P.-Cambridge, 1896) — Mexico to Panama
 T. adrianopoli Drensky, 1915 — Bulgaria, Greece, Crete, Turkey
 T. aeolium Levi, 1963 — USA
 T. agrarium Levi, 1963 — Brazil
 T. agreste Nicolet, 1849 — Chile
 T. agrifoliae Levi, 1957 — USA, Canada
 T. akme Levi, 1959 — Panama
 T. akron Levi, 1959 — Panama
 T. albidorsum Strand, 1909 — South Africa
 T. albidum Banks, 1895 — USA, Canada
 T. albioculum Zhu, 1998 — China
 T. albipes L. Koch, 1878 — Russia, Georgia
 T. albocinctum Urquhart, 1892 — New Zealand
 T. albodecoratum Rainbow, 1916 — Queensland
 T. albolineatum Nicolet, 1849 — Chile
 T. albolineolatum Caporiacco, 1940 — Ethiopia
 T. albomaculosum O. P.-Cambridge, 1869 — Sri Lanka
 T. albopictum Thorell, 1898 — Myanmar
 T. albostriatum (L. Koch, 1867) — New Guinea, Queensland, Tonga, Norfolk Islands
 T. albulum O. P.-Cambridge, 1898 — Panama
 T. altum Levi, 1963 — Paraguay
 T. amarga Levi, 1967 — Chile, Argentina
 T. amatitlan Levi, 1963 — Guatemala
 T. ambiguum Nicolet, 1849 — Chile
 T. ampascachi Mello-Leitão, 1941 — Argentina
 T. ampliatum Urquhart, 1892 — New Zealand
 T. angusticeps Caporiacco, 1949 — Kenya
 T. angustifrons Caporiacco, 1934 — Karakorum
 T. annulipes O. P.-Cambridge, 1869 — Sri Lanka
 T. anson Levi, 1967 — Juan Fernandez Islands
 T. antillanum Simon, 1894 — West Indies
 T. antron Levi, 1963 — Brazil
 T. apiculatum Roewer, 1942 — Queensland
 T. aporum Levi, 1963 — Brazil
 T. apostoli Mello-Leitão, 1945 — Argentina
 T. apulco Levi, 1959 — Mexico
 T. aragua Levi, 1963 — Venezuela
 T. archeri Levi, 1959 — Cuba
 T. argentatulum Roewer, 1942 — New Zealand
 T. arizonense Levi, 1957 — USA
 T. artum Levi, 1959 — Panama, Trinidad
 T. aruanum Strand, 1911 — Aru Islands
 T. arushae Caporiacco, 1947 — Tanzania
 T. asbolodes Rainbow, 1917 — South Australia
 T. astrigerum Thorell, 1895 — Myanmar
 T. atratum Thorell, 1877 — Sulawesi
 T. attritum (Simon, 1908) — Western Australia
 T. auberti Simon, 1904 — South Africa
 T. aulos Levi, 1963 — Brazil
 T. australe Banks, 1899 — USA, Mexico, West Indies
 T. baccula Thorell, 1887 — Myanmar
 T. baltasarense Levi, 1963 — Windward Islands
 T. banksi Berland, 1920 — East Africa
 T. barbarae Levi, 1959 — Mexico
 T. beebei Levi, 1963 — Venezuela
 T. bellatulum Levi, 1963 — Brazil
 T. bergi Levi, 1963 — Brazil, Paraguay, Argentina
 T. berlandi Roewer, 1942 — Samoa
 T. betteni Wiehle, 1960 — Palearctic
 T. bicruciatum Roewer, 1961 — Senegal
 T. bidepressum Yin, Peng & Zhang, 2005 — China
 T. biezankoi Levi, 1963 — Brazil
 T. biforaminum Gao & Zhu, 1993 — China
 T. biolleyi Banks, 1909 — Costa Rica
 T. biseriatum Thorell, 1890 — Sumatra
 T. bitakum Barrion & Litsinger, 1995 — Philippines
 T. blackwalli O. P.-Cambridge, 1871 — Europe, Russia, Ukraine, North Africa
 T. blaisei Simon, 1909 — Vietnam
 T. boesenbergi Strand, 1904 — Europe, Russia, Ukraine
 T. bolivari Levi, 1959 — Mexico
 T. bolum Levi, 1963 — Brazil
 T. bomae Schmidt, 1957 — Congo
 T. botanicum Levi, 1963 — Venezuela
 T. brachypus Thorell, 1887 — Myanmar
 T. bradyanum Strand, 1907 — South Africa
 T. brunellii Caporiacco, 1940 — Ethiopia
 T. brunneonigrum Caporiacco, 1949 — Kenya
 T. bryantae Roewer, 1951 — Mexico
 T. bullatum Tullgren, 1910 — Tanzania
 T. buxtoni Berland, 1929 — Samoa, Henderson Islands, Tuamotu Arch.
 T. calcynatum Holmberg, 1876 — Venezuela to Argentina
 T. californicum Banks, 1904 — USA, Canada
 T. caliginosum Marples, 1955 — Samoa
 T. cameronense Levi, 1957 — USA, Mexico
 T. campestratum Simon, 1900 — Hawaii
 T. caplandense Strand, 1907 — South Africa
 T. carinatum Yin, Peng & Zhang, 2005 — China
 T. carpathium Brignoli, 1984 — Greece
 T. cassinicola Simon, 1907 — Guinea-Bissau
 T. castaneum Franganillo, 1931 — Cuba
 T. catharina Marples, 1955 — Samoa
 T. cavipalpe (F. O. P.-Cambridge, 1902) — Guatemala
 T. cazieri Levi, 1959 — Bahama Islands
 T. centrum Levi, 1959 — Panama
 T. chacoense Levi, 1963 — Bolivia
 T. chakinuense Wunderlich, 1995 — Turkmenistan
 T. chamberlini Caporiacco, 1949 — Kenya
 T. charitonowi Caporiacco, 1949 — Kenya
 T. cheimatos Gertsch & Archer, 1942 — USA
 T. cheni Zhu, 1998 — China
 T. chihuahua Levi, 1959 — Mexico
 T. chiriqui Levi, 1959 — Panama
 T. chonetum Zhu, 1998 — China
 T. choroni Levi, 1963 — Venezuela
 T. cinctipes Banks, 1898 — USA, Mexico
 T. cinereum Thorell, 1875 — Russia, Ukraine
 T. circumtextum Simon, 1907 — Guinea-Bissau
 T. climacode Thorell, 1898 — Myanmar
 T. clivalum Zhu, 1998 — China
 T. cloxum Roberts, 1983 — Aldabra
 T. clypeatellum Tullgren, 1910 — East Africa
 T. cochise Levi, 1963 — USA
 T. cochrum Levi, 1963 — Brazil
 T. cocosense Strand, 1906 — Costa Rica
 T. coenosum Thorell, 1887 — Myanmar
 T. cohni Levi, 1963 — Brazil
 T. coldeniae Baert & Maelfait, 1986 — Galapagos Islands
 T. comstocki Berland, 1920 — East Africa
 T. confusum O. P.-Cambridge, 1885 — Yarkand
 T. conigerum Simon, 1914 — Europe, Russia
 T. contreras Levi, 1959 — Mexico
 T. convexellum Roewer, 1942 — Queensland, New South Wales
 T. convexisternum Caporiacco, 1949 — Kenya
 T. corcyraeum Brignoli, 1984 — Corfu
 T. costaricaense Levi, 1963 — Costa Rica to Venezuela
 T. cowlesae Levi, 1957 — USA
 T. coyoacan Levi, 1959 — Mexico
 T. crinigerum Simon, 1881 — Corsica, Italy, Morocco, Algeria
 T. cruciferum Urquhart, 1886 — New Zealand
 T. crucum Levi, 1959 — Mexico
 T. cuspulatum Schmidt & Krause, 1998 — Cape Verde Islands
 T. cuyutlan Levi, 1963 — Mexico
 T. cynicum Gertsch & Mulaik, 1936 — USA, Mexico
 T. dafnense Levy & Amitai, 1982 — Israel
 T. darolense Strand, 1906 — Ethiopia
 T. davisorum Levi, 1959 — Mexico
 T. dayongense Zhu, 1998 — China
 T. decemmaculatum Thorell, 1890 — Sumatra
 T. decemperlatum (Simon, 1889) — Madagascar
 T. dedux O. P.-Cambridge, 1904 — South Africa
 T. delicatum O. P.-Cambridge, 1904 — South Africa
 T. derhami Simon, 1895 — Sierra Leone, Gabon, Bioko
 T. diadematum Chrysanthus, 1963 — New Guinea
 T. dianiphum Rainbow, 1916 — Queensland
 T. differens Emerton, 1882 — USA, Canada
 T. dilucidum Simon, 1897 — Costa Rica to Venezuela, West Indies
 T. dilutum Levi, 1957 — USA, Mexico
 T. dividuum Gertsch & Archer, 1942 — USA
 T. dominica Levi, 1963 — Dominica
 T. dreisbachi Levi, 1959 — Mexico
 T. dubium Bradley, 1877 — New Guinea
 T. dukouense Zhu, 1998 — China
 T. dulcineum Gertsch & Archer, 1942 — USA
 T. durbanicum Lawrence, 1947 — South Africa
 T. ecuadorense Levi, 1963 — Ecuador
 T. egyptium Fawzy & El Erksousy, 2002 — Egypt
 T. electum (O. P.-Cambridge, 1896) — Mexico
 T. elegantissimum Roewer, 1942 — Taiwan
 T. elevatum Thorell, 1881 — Queensland
 T. elimatum L. Koch, 1882 — Mallorca
 T. elisabethae Roewer, 1951 — Mexico
 T. elli Sedgwick, 1973 — Chile
 T. ellicottense Dobyns & Bond, 1996 — USA
 T. emertoni Berland, 1920 — East Africa
 T. epiense Berland, 1938 — New Hebrides
 T. eremum Levi, 1963 — Brazil
 T. eugeni Roewer, 1942 — Bioko
 T. evexum Keyserling, 1884 — Mexico, West Indies to Brazil
 T. excavatum F. O. P.-Cambridge, 1902 — Guatemala
 T. exlineae Levi, 1963 — Ecuador, Peru
 T. expallidatum O. P.-Cambridge, 1885 — Yarkand
 T. familiare O. P.-Cambridge, 1871 — Palearctic
 T. fastosum Keyserling, 1884 — Ecuador, Peru
 T. fatuhivaense Berland, 1933 — Marquesas Islands
 T. femorale Thorell, 1881 — Queensland
 T. femoratissimum Caporiacco, 1949 — Kenya
 T. fernandense Simon, 1907 — Bioko
 T. filum Levi, 1963 — Brazil
 T. flabelliferum Urquhart, 1887 — New Zealand
 T. flavonotatum Becker, 1879 — USA, Cuba
 T. flavoornatum Thorell, 1898 — Myanmar
 T. fornicatum Simon, 1884 — Sudan
 T. frio Levi, 1959 — Mexico
 T. frizzellorum Levi, 1963 — Colombia, Ecuador, Venezuela
 T. frondeum Hentz, 1850 — USA, Bahama Islands
 T. fruticum Simon, 1890 — Yemen
 T. fungosum Keyserling, 1886 — Ecuador, Peru
 T. furfuraceum Simon, 1914 — France, Algeria, Syria
 T. fuscodecoratum Rainbow, 1916 — Queensland
 T. fuscomaculatum Rainbow, 1916 — Queensland
 T. fuscum Franganillo, 1930 — Cuba
 T. gabardi Simon, 1895 — Sri Lanka
 T. galerum Levi, 1959 — Panama
 T. gekkonicum Levy & Amitai, 1982 — Israel
 T. geminipunctum Chamberlin, 1924 — USA, Mexico
 T. genistae Simon, 1873 — Western Mediterranean to Uzbekistan
 T. genistae turanicum Charitonov, 1946 — Uzbekistan
 T. gentile Simon, 1881 — Corsica, Algeria
 T. gertschi Levi, 1959 — USA, Mexico
 T. gibbum Rainbow, 1916 — Queensland
 T. gigantipes Keyserling, 1890 — New South Wales, Victoria
 T. giraulti Rainbow, 1916 — Queensland
 T. glaciale Caporiacco, 1934 — Karakorum
 T. glaucescens Becker, 1879 — USA, Canada
 T. glaucinum Simon, 1881 — France
 T. goodnightorum Levi, 1957 — USA, Mexico
 T. gracilipes Urquhart, 1889 — New Zealand
 T. grallator Simon, 1900 — Hawaii
 T. gramineum Zhu, 1998 — China
 T. grammatophorum Simon, 1909 — Vietnam
 T. grancanariense Wunderlich, 1987 — Canary Islands
 T. grandiosum Levi, 1963 — Peru
 T. grecia Levi, 1959 — Mexico to Venezuela
 T. gyirongense Hu & Li, 1987 — China
 T. hainenense Zhu, 1998 — China
 T. haleakalense Simon, 1900 — Hawaii
 T. hannoniae Denis, 1944 — Europe, North Africa, Madeira, Canary Islands
 T. hartmeyeri Simon, 1908 — Western Australia
 T. hassleri Levi, 1963 — Hispaniola
 T. hebridisianum Berland, 1938 — New Hebrides
 T. helophorum Thorell, 1895 — Java
 T. hemerobium Simon, 1914 — USA, Canada, Europe
 T. hermonense Levy, 1991 — Israel
 T. hewitti Caporiacco, 1949 — Ethiopia
 T. hidalgo Levi, 1957 — USA, Mexico
 T. hierichonticum Levy & Amitai, 1982 — Israel
 T. hispidum O. P.-Cambridge, 1898 — Mexico, West Indies to Paraguay
 T. histrionicum Thorell, 1875 — Balkans
 T. hondurense Levi, 1959 — Honduras
 T. hopkinsi Berland, 1929 — Samoa
 T. hotanense Zhu & Zhou, 1993 — China
 T. huanuco Levi, 1963 — Peru
 T. hufengensis Tang, Yin & Peng, 2005 — China
 T. hui Zhu, 1998 — China
 T. humboldti Levi, 1967 — Peru
 T. hummeli Schenkel, 1936 — China
 T. idiotypum Rainbow, 1917 — South Australia
 T. illecebrosum Simon, 1886 — Senegal
 T. impegrum Keyserling, 1886 — Brazil
 T. impressithorax Simon, 1895 — Philippines
 T. incanescens Simon, 1890 — Yemen
 T. incertissimum (Caporiacco, 1954) — French Guiana, Brazil
 T. incertum O. P.-Cambridge, 1885 — India
 T. incomtum (O. P.-Cambridge, 1896) — Guatemala
 T. inconspicuum Thorell, 1898 — Myanmar
 T. indicum Tikader, 1977 — Andaman Islands
 T. innocuum Thorell, 1875 — Russia, Ukraine
 T. inquinatum Thorell, 1878 — Myanmar, Singapore, Amboina
 T. inquinatum continentale Strand, 1907 — China
 T. insignitarse Simon, 1907 — Gabon
 T. intritum (Bishop & Crosby, 1926) — USA
 T. iramon Levi, 1963 — Colombia, Ecuador
 T. ischagosum Barrion & Litsinger, 1995 — Philippines
 T. isorium Levi, 1963 — Peru
 T. istokpoga Levi, 1957 — USA to Panama
 T. italiense Wunderlich, 1995 — Italy
 T. jordanense Levy & Amitai, 1982 — Israel
 T. kambalum Barrion & Litsinger, 1995 — Philippines
 T. karamayense Zhu, 1998 — China
 T. kauaiense Simon, 1900 — Hawaii
 T. kawea Levi, 1957 — USA, Mexico
 T. kibonotense Tullgren, 1910 — East Africa
 T. kiliani Müller & Heimer, 1990 — Colombia
 T. kobrooricum Strand, 1911 — Aru Islands
 T. kochi Roewer, 1942 — Samoa
 T. kollari Doleschall, 1852 — Austria
 T. kraepelini Simon, 1905 — Java
 T. kraussi Marples, 1957 — Fiji
 T. lacticolor Berland, 1920 — Kenya, Yemen, Madagascar
 T. laevigatum Blackwall, 1870 — Italy
 T. lago Levi, 1963 — Ecuador
 T. lamperti Strand, 1906 — Ethiopia
 T. lanceatum Zhang & Zhu, 2007 — China
 T. lapidicola Kulczynski, 1887 — Italy
 T. latisternum Caporiacco, 1934 — Karakorum
 T. lawrencei Gertsch & Archer, 1942 — USA
 T. leechi Gertsch & Archer, 1942 — USA, Canada
 T. leguiai Chamberlin, 1916 — Colombia, Peru
 T. lenzianum Strand, 1907 — South Africa
 T. leones Levi, 1959 — Mexico
 T. leucophaeum Simon, 1905 — India
 T. leve Blackwall, 1877 — Seychelles
 T. leviorum Gertsch & Riechert, 1976 — USA
 T. liaoyuanense (Zhu & Yu, 1982) — China
 T. limatum Tullgren, 1910 — Tanzania
 T. limitatum L. Koch, 1872 — Queensland, New South Wales
 T. linaresense Levi, 1963 — Chile
 T. linzhiense Hu, 2001 — China
 T. llano Levi, 1957 — USA
 T. lomirae Roewer, 1938 — New Guinea
 T. logan Levi and Patrick, 2013 — USA
 T. longicrure Marples, 1956 — New Zealand
 T. longihirsutum Strand, 1907 — China
 T. longipalpum Zhu, 1998 — China, Korea
 T. longipedatum Roewer, 1942 — Colombia
 T. ludekingi Thorell, 1890 — Java
 T. ludius Simon, 1880 — Malaysia to Australia, New Caledonia
 T. lumabani Barrion & Litsinger, 1995 — Philippines
 T. luteitarse Schmidt & Krause, 1995 — Cape Verde Islands
 T. macei Simon, 1895 — Congo
 T. machu Levi, 1963 — Peru
 T. macropora Tang, Yin & Peng, 2006 — China
 T. macuchi Levi, 1963 — Ecuador
 T. maculiferum Roewer, 1942 — Zanzibar
 T. magdalenense Müller & Heimer, 1990 — Colombia
 T. maindroni Simon, 1905 — India
 T. manjithar Tikader, 1970 — India
 T. manonoense Marples, 1955 — Samoa
 T. maranum Levi, 1963 — Venezuela
 T. maron Levi, 1963 — Paraguay
 T. martini Levi, 1959 — Mexico
 T. mataafa Marples, 1955 — Samoa
 T. mauense Caporiacco, 1949 — Kenya
 T. mauiense Simon, 1900 — Hawaii
 T. mehlum Roberts, 1983 — Aldabra
 T. melanoplax Schmidt & Krause, 1996 — Canary Islands
 T. melanoprorum Thorell, 1895 — Myanmar
 T. melanoprorum orientale Simon, 1909 — Vietnam
 T. melanosternon Mello-Leitão, 1947 — Brazil
 T. melanostictum O. P.-Cambridge, 1876 — Mediterranean, Aldabra, Seychelles, China, Japan, USA, Hispaniola
 T. melanurum Hahn, 1831 — Holarctic, Azores
 T. melinum Simon, 1900 — Hawaii
 T. mendozae Berland, 1933 — Marquesas Islands
 T. meneghettii Caporiacco, 1949 — Kenya
 T. metabolum Chamberlin & Ivie, 1936 — Panama
 T. metator Simon, 1907 — Guinea-Bissau
 T. michelbacheri Levi, 1957 — USA
 T. micheneri Levi, 1963 — Panama
 T. minutissimum Keyserling, 1884 — Panama, Peru
 T. minutulum Thorell, 1895 — Myanmar
 T. miserum Thorell, 1898 — Myanmar
 T. modestum (Simon, 1894) — Sri Lanka
 T. molliculum Thorell, 1899 — Cameroon
 T. mollissimum L. Koch, 1872 — Australia, Samoa
 T. montanum Emerton, 1882 — USA, Canada, Alaska, Norway, Finland, Russia
 T. monzonense Levi, 1963 — Peru
 T. mortuale Simon, 1908 — Western Australia
 T. morulum O. P.-Cambridge, 1898 — USA, Mexico
 T. murarium Emerton, 1882 — North America
 T. musivivoides Schmidt & Krause, 1995 — Cape Verde Islands
 T. musivivum Schmidt, 1956 — Canary Islands
 T. musivum Simon, 1873 — Mediterranean
 T. myersi Levi, 1957 — USA, Mexico, Jamaica
 T. mystaceum L. Koch, 1870 — Palearctic
 T. mysteriosum Schmidt, 1971 — Ecuador
 T. nadleri Levi, 1959 — Trinidad
 T. nagorum Roberts, 1983 — Aldabra
 T. nasinotum Caporiacco, 1949 — Kenya
 T. nasutum Wunderlich, 1995 — Sardinia
 T. necijaense Barrion & Litsinger, 1995 — Philippines
 T. negebense Levy & Amitai, 1982 — Israel
 T. neomexicanum Banks, 1901 — USA, Canada
 T. neshamini Levi, 1957 — USA
 T. nesticum Levi, 1963 — Trinidad
 T. nigriceps Keyserling, 1891 — Brazil
 T. nigroannulatum Keyserling, 1884 — Ecuador, Peru
 T. nigroplagiatum Caporiacco, 1949 — Kenya
 T. nigropunctatum Lucas, 1846 — Mediterranean
 T. nigropunctulatum Thorell, 1898 — Myanmar
 T. nigrosacculatum Tullgren, 1910 — Tanzania
 T. nigrovariegatum Simon, 1873 — Palearctic
 T. pierre Levi and Patrick, 2013 — USA
 T. nilgherinum Simon, 1905 — India
 T. niphocosmum Rainbow, 1916 — Queensland
 T. niveopunctatum Thorell, 1898 — Myanmar
 T. niveum O. P.-Cambridge, 1898 — Mexico
 T. nivosum Rainbow, 1916 — Queensland
 T. nodiferum Simon, 1895 — Sri Lanka
 T. nojimai Yoshida, 1999 — Japan
 T. nudum Levi, 1959 — Mexico, Panama
 T. oatesi Thorell, 1895 — Myanmar
 T. obscuratum Zhu, 1998 — China
 T. ochreolum Levy & Amitai, 1982 — Israel
 T. octoferum Strand, 1909 — South Africa
 T. odoratum Zhu, 1998 — China
 T. ohlerti Thorell, 1870 — Holarctic
 T. ohlerti lundbecki Sørensen, 1898 — Greenland
 T. olaup Levi, 1963 — Brazil
 T. omiltemi Levi, 1959 — Mexico, Guatemala
 T. onticolum Levi, 1963 — Peru
 T. opolon Levi, 1963 — Brazil
 T. opuntia Levi, 1963 — Mexico
 T. orgea (Levi, 1967) — Brazil
 T. orlando (Archer, 1950) — USA
 T. osprum Levi, 1963 — Venezuela
 T. oswaldocruzi Levi, 1963 — Brazil
 T. otsospotum Barrion & Litsinger, 1995 — Philippines
 T. palanum Roberts, 1983 — Aldabra
 T. palgongense Paik, 1996 — Korea
 T. pallidulum Roewer, 1942 — East Africa
 T. palmgreni Marusik & Tsellarius, 1986 — Finland, Poland, Estonia, Russia
 T. pandani Simon, 1895 — Cambodia
 T. panganii Caporiacco, 1947 — Tanzania
 T. paraense Levi, 1963 — Brazil
 T. parvulum Blackwall, 1870 — Sicily
 T. parvum Keyserling, 1884 — Peru
 T. patrizii Caporiacco, 1933 — Libya
 T. pelaezi Levi, 1963 — Mexico
 T. pennsylvanicum Emerton, 1913 — USA, Canada
 T. perkinsi Simon, 1900 — Hawaii
 T. pernambucum Levi, 1963 — Brazil
 T. perpusillum Simon, 1885 — Malaysia
 T. petraeum L. Koch, 1872 — Holarctic
 T. petrunkevitchi Berland, 1920 — East Africa
 T. phaeostomum Simon, 1909 — Vietnam
 T. pictum (Walckenaer, 1802) — Holarctic
 T. pigrum Keyserling, 1886 — Brazil
 T. pilatum Urquhart, 1893 — Tasmania
 T. piligerum Frauenfeld, 1867 — Nicobar Islands
 T. piliphilum Strand, 1907 — South Africa
 T. pinastri L. Koch, 1872 — Palearctic
 T. pinguiculum Simon, 1909 — Vietnam
 T. pinicola Simon, 1873 — Corsica
 T. pires Levi, 1963 — Brazil
 T. piriforme Berland, 1938 — New Hebrides
 T. plaumanni Levi, 1963 — Venezuela, Brazil
 T. plectile Simon, 1909 — Vietnam
 T. plumipes Hasselt, 1882 — Sumatra
 T. pluviale Tullgren, 1910 — Tanzania
 T. poecilum Zhu, 1998 — China
 T. porphyreticum Urquhart, 1889 — New Zealand
 T. positivum Chamberlin, 1924 — USA, West Indies to Paraguay
 T. posticatum Simon, 1900 — Hawaii
 T. postmarginatum Tullgren, 1910 — Tanzania
 T. praeclusum Tullgren, 1910 — Tanzania
 T. praemite Simon, 1907 — Sierra Leone
 T. praetextum Simon, 1900 — Hawaii
 T. praetextum concolor Simon, 1900 — Hawaii
 T. prominens Blackwall, 1870 — Italy
 T. proximum Lawrence, 1964 — South Africa
 T. puellae Locket, 1980 — Comoro Islands
 T. pulanense Hu, 2001 — China
 T. pumilio Urquhart, 1886 — New Zealand
 T. punctipes Emerton, 1924 — USA, Mexico
 T. punicapunctatum Urquhart, 1891 — New Zealand
 T. punongpalayum Barrion & Litsinger, 1995 — Philippines
 T. purcelli O. P.-Cambridge, 1904 — St. Helena, South Africa
 T. pyramidale L. Koch, 1867 — Queensland, New South Wales
 T. pyrenaeum Denis, 1944 — Spain, Andorra
 T. qingzangense Hu, 2001 — China
 T. quadratum (O. P.-Cambridge, 1882) — Sri Lanka, Sumatra
 T. quadrilineatum Lenz, 1886 — Madagascar
 T. quadripapulatum Thorell, 1895 — Myanmar
 T. quadripartitum Keyserling, 1891 — Brazil
 T. rabuni Chamberlin & Ivie, 1944 — USA, Bahama Islands
 T. rafflesi Simon, 1899 — Sumatra
 T. rampum Levi, 1963 — Peru, Venezuela
 T. ravum Levi, 1963 — Venezuela
 T. refugum Drensky, 1929 — Austria, Balkans, Bulgaria, Greece, Russia
 T. reinhardti Charitonov, 1946 — Uzbekistan
 T. resum Levi, 1959 — Panama
 T. retreatense Strand, 1909 — South Africa
 T. retrocitum Simon, 1909 — Vietnam
 T. rhodonotum Simon, 1909 — Vietnam
 T. ricense Levi, 1959 — Puerto Rico
 T. rossi Levi, 1963 — Peru
 T. rostriferum Simon, 1895 — West Africa
 T. rothi Levi, 1959 — Mexico
 T. rubiginosum Keyserling, 1884 — Brazil
 T. rubrum (Keyserling, 1886) — Brazil
 T. rurrenabaque Levi, 1963 — Bolivia
 T. ruwenzoricola Strand, 1913 — Central Africa
 T. saanichum Chamberlin & Ivie, 1947 — USA, Canada, Alaska
 T. sabinjonis Strand, 1913 — Central Africa
 T. sadani Monga & Singh, 1989 — India
 T. samoense Berland, 1929 — Samoa
 T. sanctum Levi, 1959 — Mexico
 T. sangzhiense Zhu, 1998 — China
 T. sardis Chamberlin & Ivie, 1944 — USA
 T. saropus Thorell, 1887 — Myanmar
 T. schlingeri Levi, 1963 — Peru
 T. schrammeli Levi, 1963 — Mexico
 T. sciaphilum Benoit, 1977 — St. Helena
 T. semitinctum Simon, 1914 — Spain, France, Balearic is.
 T. senckenbergi Levi, 1963 — Venezuela
 T. septempunctatum Berland, 1933 — Marquesas Islands
 T. serpatusum Guan & Zhu, 1993 — China
 T. sertatum Simon, 1909 — Vietnam
 T. setiferum Roewer, 1942 — Myanmar
 T. setosum L. Koch, 1872 — Queensland, New Hebrides, Samoa, New Caledonia
 T. setum Zhu, 1998 — China
 T. seximaculatum Zhu, 1998 — China
 T. sibiricum Marusik, 1988 — Russia, Mongolia
 T. sinaloa Levi, 1959 — Mexico
 T. sisyphium (Clerck, 1757) — Palearctic
 T. sisyphium foliiferum Thorell, 1875 — Spain
 T. sisyphium torandae Strand, 1917 — Yarkand, Karakorum
 T. soaresi Levi, 1963 — Brazil
 T. societatis Berland, 1934 — Tahiti
 T. solium Benoit, 1977 — St. Helena
 T. spinigerum Rainbow, 1916 — Queensland
 T. spinitarse O. P.-Cambridge, 1876 — North Africa
 T. spinosissimum Caporiacco, 1934 — Karakorum
 T. squalidum Urquhart, 1886 — New Zealand
 T. stamotum Levi, 1963 — Venezuela
 T. stannardi Levi, 1963 — Mexico
 T. strepitus Peck & Shear, 1987 — Galapagos Islands
 T. striatum Keyserling, 1884 — Brazil
 T. styligerum F. O. P.-Cambridge, 1902 — Mexico, Guatemala
 T. subitum O. P.-Cambridge, 1885 — India
 T. submirabile Zhu & Song, 1993 — China, Korea
 T. submissum Gertsch & Davis, 1936 — USA, Mexico, Bahama Islands, Jamaica
 T. subpingue Simon, 1908 — Western Australia
 T. subradiatum Simon, 1901 — Malaysia
 T. subrotundum Keyserling, 1891 — Brazil
 T. subvittatum Simon, 1889 — India
 T. sulawesiense Marusik & Penney, 2005 — Sulawesi
 T. swarczewskii Wierzbicki, 1902 — Azerbaijan
 T. taegense Paik, 1996 — Korea
 T. tahitiae Berland, 1934 — Tahiti
 T. tamerlani Roewer, 1942 — Myanmar
 T. tayrona Müller & Heimer, 1990 — Colombia
 T. tebanum Levi, 1963 — Venezuela
 T. teliferum Simon, 1895 — Sri Lanka
 T. tenellum C. L. Koch, 1841 — Greece
 T. tenuissimum Thorell, 1898 — Myanmar
 T. teresae Levi, 1963 — Brazil
 T. tessellatum Thorell, 1899 — Cameroon
 T. teutanoides Caporiacco, 1949 — Kenya
 T. thaleri Marusik, 1988 — Russia
 T. thalia Workman, 1878 — Myanmar
 T. theridioides (Keyserling, 1890) — China, Queensland, New South Wales
 T. thorelli L. Koch, 1865 — New South Wales
 T. tigrae Esyunin & Efimik, 1996 — Russia
 T. tikaderi Patel, 1973 — India
 T. timpanogos Levi, 1957 — USA
 T. tinctorium Keyserling, 1891 — Brazil
 T. t-notatum Thorell, 1895 — Myanmar, Singapore
 T. todinum Simon, 1880 — New Caledonia
 T. topo Levi, 1963 — Ecuador
 T. torosum Keyserling, 1884 — Peru
 T. trahax Blackwall, 1866 — Africa
 T. transgressum Petrunkevitch, 1911 — USA, Mexico
 T. trepidum O. P.-Cambridge, 1898 — Mexico to Panama
 T. triangulare Franganillo, 1936 — Cuba
 T. trifile Simon, 1907 — West, East Africa
 T. trigonicum Thorell, 1890 — Sumatra, Java
 T. tristani Levi, 1959 — Costa Rica
 T. triviale Thorell, 1881 — Australia
 T. trizonatum Caporiacco, 1949 — Kenya
 T. tubicola Doleschall, 1859 — Java, Moluccas, New Guinea
 T. tungurahua Levi, 1963 — Venezuela, Ecuador, Brazil
 T. turrialba Levi, 1959 — Costa Rica
 T. uber Keyserling, 1884 — Brazil
 T. uhligi Martin, 1974 — Europe
 T. umbilicus Levi, 1963 — Brazil
 T. uncatum F. O. P.-Cambridge, 1902 — Mexico
 T. undatum Zhu, 1998 — China
 T. undulanotum Roewer, 1942 — New Hebrides
 T. urnigerum Thorell, 1898 — Myanmar
 T. ursoi Caporiacco, 1947 — Ethiopia
 T. urucum Levi, 1963 — Brazil
 T. usitum Strand, 1913 — Central Africa
 T. utcuyacu Levi, 1963 — Peru
 T. valleculum Levi, 1959 — Panama
 T. vallisalinarum Levy & Amitai, 1982 — Israel
 T. vanhoeffeni Strand, 1909 — South Africa
 T. varians Hahn, 1833 — Holarctic
 T. varians cyrenaicum Caporiacco, 1933 — Libya
 T. varians melanotum Strand, 1907 — Germany
 T. varians rusticum Simon, 1873 — Western Mediterranean
 T. ventricosum Rainbow, 1916 — Queensland
 T. vespertinum Levy, 1985 — Israel
 T. viridanum Urquhart, 1887 — New Zealand
 T. volubile Keyserling, 1884 — Venezuela, Ecuador, Peru
 T. vosserleri Strand, 1907 — East Africa
 T. vossi Strand, 1907 — Cameroon
 T. vossioni Simon, 1884 — Sudan
 T. vulvum Levi, 1959 — Panama
 T. weberi Thorell, 1892 — Singapore
 T. weyrauchi Levi, 1963 — Peru
 T. whitcombi Sedgwick, 1973 — Chile
 T. wiehlei Schenkel, 1938 — Spain, France, Algeria
 T. workmani Thorell, 1887 — Myanmar
 T. xianfengense Zhu & Song, 1992 — China, Taiwan
 T. xinjiangense (Hu & Wu, 1989) — China
 T. yani Zhu, 1998 — China
 T. yuma Levi, 1963 — USA
 T. yunnanense Schenkel, 1963 — China
 T. zantholabio Urquhart, 1886 — New Zealand
 T. zebra Caporiacco, 1949 — Kenya
 T. zebrinum Zhu, 1998 — China
 T. zekharya Levy, 2007 — Israel
 T. zhangmuense Hu, 2001 — China
 T. zhaoi Zhu, 1998 — China
 T. zhoui Zhu, 1998 — China
 T. zonarium Keyserling, 1884 — Peru
 T. zonatum Eydoux & Souleyet, 1841 — Unknown
 T. zonulatum Thorell, 1890 — Sumatra

References

External links

 Society-focused spiders live and hunt together - NewScientist.com

Theridiidae
Araneomorphae genera
Cosmopolitan spiders